Club 31 de Octubre is a Bolivian football club based in La Paz. Founded on 21 November 1954, it currently plays in Liga de Fútbol Profesional Boliviano, holding home games at Estadio Hernando Siles, with a 42,000-seat capacity.

History
The club was founded in 1954 as Club 31 de Octubre, and participated in the 1967 Copa Libertadores.

Honours

National
Copa Simón Bolivar (Primera División):
Runner-up (1): 1966

Performance in CONMEBOL competitions
Copa Libertadores: 1 appearance
1967 – First Round

External links

Association football clubs established in 1954
Football clubs in Bolivia
Football clubs in La Paz
1954 establishments in Bolivia